Childish Bromance is a 2017 South Korea reality show featuring a group of celebrity friends who take a trip together. It airs on KBS2 on Tuesdays at 23:10(KST) from October 10, 2017.

Series overview

Overview

Season 1: Dragon club 
The title of the show refers to the fact that the five stars of the show were all born in 1976, the Year of the Dragon: actors Jang Hyuk, Cha Tae-hyun and Hong Kyung-in and singers Kim Jong-kook and Hong Kyung-min. Despite being friends for over twenty years, they had never starred together on a show due to conflicting schedules and decided to take a trip to Gangwon Province for six days and five nights.

Original soundtrack

Part 1

Part 2

Ratings 

Season 1

Note 

Episode 4's broadcast was delayed for 4 weeks due to a workers strike at KBS

Season 2

References

South Korean reality television series
2017 South Korean television series debuts
2018 South Korean television series endings
2018 South Korean television seasons